United Nations Security Council Resolution 1656, was adopted unanimously on January 31, 2006, after reaffirming all resolutions on Abkhazia and Georgia, particularly Resolution 1615 (2005). The Council extended the mandate of the United Nations Observer Mission in Georgia (UNOMIG) until March 31, 2006.

In his report on the situation, the Secretary-General Kofi Annan had recommended an extension until July 31, 2006, though this was not adopted by Council members, due to the insistence of Russia.

See also
 Georgian–Abkhazian conflict
 List of United Nations Security Council Resolutions 1601 to 1700 (2005–2006)
 United Nations resolutions on Abkhazia

References

External links
 
Text of the Resolution at undocs.org

 1656
Abkhaz–Georgian conflict
2006 in Georgia (country)
2006 in Abkhazia
 1656
 1656
January 2006 events